New Recording is a solo album by the Scottish rock musician and member of Deacon Blue, Ricky Ross. It was produced by Ross and the former Love and Money keyboard, player Paul McGeechan.

After Ross' previous album's focus on hard edged electric guitar, New Recording is largely acoustic. This second post-Deacon Blue solo album is a much more intimate work – a melodic mix of piano or acoustic guitar and ambient, often dreamy, keyboard effects and sound samples.

The album includes a re-recorded version of "The Undeveloped Heart", which appeared on Deacon Blue's Ooh Las Vegas compilation album.

No singles were released from this album, but a yet-again remixed version of "Undeveloped Heart" was subsequently released on The Undeveloped Heart EP.

Track listing 
All songs written by Ricky Ross, except where noted:

  "My Only Tie" – 3:11
  "Blue Horse" – 2:33
  "The Further North You Go" – 3:38
  "The Undeveloped Heart" – 4:32
  "Cresswell Street" (Ross, Lorraine McIntosh) – 3:19
  "I Love You" – 4:23
  "Earth a Little Lighter" – 3:28
  "I'm Sure Buddy Would Know" – 2:12
  "Here's Singer" – 3:35
  "On the Line" – 2:18
  "Ash Wednesday" – 5:18

Personnel
 Ricky Ross – vocals, keyboards, guitar
 Paul McGeechan – programming, noises
 Brian Docherty – bass guitar on "I Love You"
 Lorraine McIntosh – vocals on "Cresswell Street"

1997 albums
Ricky Ross (musician) albums